is a Japanese manga series by Miwa Ueda. A high school drama centered on character Momo Adachi, her love life, friendships and rivalries, it was published in Japan by Kodansha in Bessatsu Friend from 1998 to 2003 and collected in 18 volumes. The series was adapted as a Taiwanese drama in 2002 and a Japanese animated television series in 2005. A manga sequel set 10 years after the original manga, titled Peach Girl Next, began its serialization on Be Love on August 12, 2016. It ended with a total of eight volumes, the last of which was released in January 2020. On mid-March 2016, the live-action film adaptation was announced. The film was released in Japan on May 20, 2017.

The North American version of the manga is published in two parts by Tokyopop: Peach Girl, covering the first eight volumes of the Japanese release; and Peach Girl: Change of Heart, comprising the final ten books. The animated TV series is distributed by Funimation Entertainment, currently known as Crunchyroll in North America.

Plot
Momo Adachi is a former member of the high school swim team. She tans easily and her hair is bleached out; unfortunately, she is stereotyped by her ignorant classmates and is forced to endure rumors about being an "easy girl" who has had many sexual relationships. Her only friend is Sae, who is actually responsible for spreading the nasty gossip due to her jealousy of Momo. Momo is in love with Toji, a taciturn baseball player, but the scheming Sae also has her sights set on the boy. Momo's life is further complicated with the introduction of Kairi Okayasu, a wise-cracking playboy who is determined to make her his. He reveals to Momo that she had saved him from drowning the summer before high school started.

Things become even more complicated when Sae, in an attempt to make Momo miserable, spreads rumors about Momo and Kairi making out. The rumor about the kiss between the two is true, but it was Kairi who initiated it while Momo remained stunned by the interaction. When Toji is hospitalized, Sae convinces Toji to break up with Momo. Thanks to Kairi, he finds out about all the lies and rumors Sae has made up. Toji saves Momo from being bullied (thanks to Sae's lies again) and tells the truth about him and Momo, resulting in the students apologizing to Momo and hating Sae. Toji and Momo get back together, but Sae later tries to complicate their relationship again by threatening to discredit Momo with her newly acquired access to the mass media. Though Toji is initially defiant, he reluctantly breaks up with Momo to protect her. Momo is heartbroken at first, particularly due to not knowing that it is part of Sae's schemes. However, she eventually begins dating Kairi, whom she had previously considered annoying, and soon begins to fall in love with him. When it is revealed to Momo why Toji broke up with her, Momo is left to choose between Toji and Kairi. More problems arise and the love triangle intensifies.

In "Sae's Story", Sae is left back a year, for she was always skipping classes. She is too stubborn so she goes to Momo's and Kairi's university every day. Toji goes to a good university by himself. Sae then meets one of her childhood sweethearts, Kanji (or Monkey Boy), who left for Malaysia when they were young, and promised to marry Sae when he was back. In love with Sae, Kanji follows her around, trying to win her over. He takes care of Sae's dog, Sora, when her parents would no longer let her keep it. The dog walks with a little limp; one day when Sora tried to follow Sae, she threw a rock at its paw and injured it. Sae starts modeling and pretends she goes to college with Momo, when she is really still in high school. She meets Honda and works for CC as a model. She meets a guy named Takuma, and he later turns her down. Sae meets another guy named Shinji but realizes he never really liked her. All these ups and downs make Sae realize that Momo, Kairi, and Kanji are the only people who care for her.

Characters

Played by: Mizuki Yamamoto (Live Action 2017)
 The main protagonist. Her given name means 'peach' in Japanese. She has tanned skin and light hair (derived from her constant swimming in chlorinated pools while on the swim team), mistakenly giving others the impression that she is a "beach bunny", lover of the Ganguro style, or sexually promiscuous. On the contrary, Momo is a shy, insecure girl. She has loved Toji for many years, although later on she finds herself falling in love with Kairi. When she found out Toji disliked girls with tan skin, she started to avoid swimming pools and wore a lot of sunblock to get her skin to its original color (presumed to be fair). Later on, Momo finds out that Toji never said he disliked girls with tan skin. Her friend (Ryoko) from junior high had made that up because she had liked him too. She is often confused later on when she likes both Toji and Kairi at the same time, causing several disputes between the two boys.

Played by: Mei Nagano (Live Action 2017)
 The main antagonist who does everything to ruin Momo's life. Sae's fair features such as her pale skin and dark hair serve as a contrast for Momo; her "innocent" appearance belies her scheming, mischievous, trouble making nature. She is the one who spreads malicious gossip about Momo; something Momo knows, but has trouble dealing with, as people are more apt to believe in Sae than the 'airheaded ganguro girl' to the point that Toji believed Sae over Momo (who was currently his girlfriend). She often uses the gossip to make people dislike Momo, as a result of her own jealousy and insecurity. She spreads rumors that she is dating Toji, and that Momo is trying to steal him from her when it is actually the other way around. She really is mean and doesn't care for Momo and isn't her "real" friend. All she wants is popularity in school, to humiliate Momo, and to get Toji all for herself. She will stop at nothing to complete this task. Later, she dates a male model named Jigoro and in the end exploits him to help break up Toji and Momo, the nastiest scheme she has ever plotted. She begins to repent after she falls in love with Ryo and understands the hurtful feeling that she caused Momo, when Ryo seemingly gets her pregnant (it later turns out to be a medical condition that simulates pregnancy) and subsequently abandons her.

Played by: Kei Inoo (Live Action 2017)
 A popular and carefree classmate of Momo's. Sae goes after him after Momo lies that she likes him to protect her and Toji's relationship, but he is the only boy to see straight through Sae for what she really is. He has the reputation of being a playboy, something he is not exactly proud of. He thought that Momo was the one who once gave him CPR when he had nearly drowned at the beach when they were younger; only to later find out he had been saved by the local male lifeguard. His interest in her is renewed when Sae spreads rumors about them being a couple; he adds to this by claiming he has kissed Momo. When Momo is upset by his rumor, he tries to make the rumor true by kissing her unexpectedly in the beginning of the series.

 After the two start dating, his insecurities about relationships are revealed to stem from his unrequited love for Misao, the school nurse and Kairi's former tutor. However, after he confesses and is shot down by her, he actually feels relieved and confident to pursue his relationship with Momo. He begins fighting over her with Toji and in the end they get back together.

The English-language manga uses the non standard romanization "Kiley Okayasu". Other groups, such as FUNimation, Kodansha, and non-English language publishers, use "Kairi".

Played by: Mackenyu (Live Action 2017)
A boy who has been Momo's crush since junior high school although she never then confessed to him due to a friend saying he "doesn't like girls with tan skin". He overhears Momo confess her love for him to Kairi and then eventually dates Momo but Sae wants him for herself. He has a good heart, but tends to be hard headed and oblivious to what is in front of him, believing what Sae says over what Momo says, much to the frustration of Momo. Sae later blackmails Toji into dating her using pictures of Momo and Jigoro in a hotel bed together. He then breaks up with Momo. After this Momo starts dating Kairi.

The Tokyopop manga renders his family name as "Toujikamori".

Played by: Yuika Motokariya (Live Action 2017)

The school nurse and a big sister figure for Momo. Misao was once Kairi's tutor and crush, and an old flame of Ryo's. Although she dated and broke up with him, she still loves him.

Played by: Kensei Mikami (Live Action 2017)
 Kairi's older brother who works in the video game industry. He serves as a male counterpart to Sae, only he is significantly more dangerous. Ryo is in love with Misao, and dated her briefly, but Misao broke up with him because of his cold and manipulating attitude which is revealed when he smacks Sae after hurting Misao.

 Sae meets him and quickly falls for him because of their obvious similarities, though Ryo barely takes the relationship seriously and treats Sae poorly. When Sae tells him she is pregnant with his child he gives her money. Ryo is quite touched by Sae when she tells him she wants to make a family with him that will love him. After they find out Sae had a false pregnancy, the two split. However, Ryo stills feels happy about what Sae told him, and seems to be interested in having kids.

Played by: Daisuke Kikuta (Live Action 2017)
 He is called  and is a male model who is smitten with Sae and unaware of her true personality. She uses him in her schemes against Momo.

 A young woman who once dated both Okayasu brothers, Morika has a grudge against Ryo and tries to use Kairi against him. Morika hires some thugs to beat up Ryo as revenge for using her.

Media

Manga

After the run of the original series, a sequel titled  was published in Japan by Kodansha in Bessatsu Friend from 2004 to 2006 and collected in three tankōbon volumes. It is told from the point of view of Sae, the main antagonist of Peach Girl. It is licensed in North America by Tokyopop.

Anime

Film

A live action film of the same name directed by Koji Shintoki was released on 20 May 2017. It stars Mizuki Yamamoto as Momo Adachi and Kei Inoo as Kairi Okayasu. Other cast members are Mackenyu as Toji, Mei Nagano as Sae Kashiwagi, Yuika Motokariya as Misao Aki, Kensei Mikami as Ryo Okayasu, and Daisuke Kikuta as Jigoro. Its main theme song is "Call Me Maybe" by Carly Rae Jepsen.

Other adaptations

Peach Girl received a 13-episode television drama in Taiwan in November 2002, starring Annie Wu, Vanness Wu of F4 and Kenji Wu. The setting was changed from high school to college. It was produced by Comic Ritz International Production and ) as producer and was broadcast in Taiwan on free-to-air Chinese Television System (CTS). The insert song "Who Do You Love If Not Me?" by Vanness Wu is also featured in the show.

Reception
The manga has sold over 13 million copies. In 1999, Peach Girl won the Kodansha Manga Award for shōjo.

References

External links

 TV Tokyo Peach Girl website 
 FUNimation Peach Girl website
 
Animerica review

1997 manga
2005 anime television series debuts
2005 Japanese television series endings
Anime series based on manga
Comedy-drama anime and manga
Drama anime and manga
Funimation
Gyaru in fiction
Kodansha manga
Manga adapted into films
Manga adapted into television series
Romance anime and manga
School life in anime and manga
Shōjo manga
Tokyopop titles
TV Tokyo original programming
Winner of Kodansha Manga Award (Shōjo)
Japanese romantic drama films